Greatest Hits is a 1963 compilation album by British instrumental group the Shadows. The album spent 56 weeks on the UK Albums Chart, peaking at number 2.

Track listing

Charts

Release history
A remastered version of the album was released on CD by EMI in 2004. The remaster includes mono and stereo versions of every track, as well as a bonus track ("Quatermassters Stores"). In 2019, this album was re-released, this time by Hallmark Music & Entertainment.

References

1963 greatest hits albums
The Shadows compilation albums
EMI Columbia Records albums